Alrix Da Costa (born October 2, 1997) is a French professional rugby league footballer who plays as a  for the Catalans Dragons in the Super League and France at international level. 

Da Costa has spent time on loan Saint-Esteve in the Elite One Championship.

Background
Da Costa was born in Foix, France.

Club career

Catalans Dragons
Da Costa came through the junior ranks at Catalans and represented France at junior level. He made his Super League debut in the victory at St Helens on April 14, 2016.
Da Costa missed Catalans 2021 Super League Grand Final loss to St Helens RFC due to injury, however he was an integral member of the team which won the League Leaders Shield that season.

International career
On 22 October 2016, Da Costa made his international debut for France in their end of year test match against England in Avignon.

He was selected in France 9s squad for the 2019 Rugby League World Cup 9s.

References

External links
Catalans Dragons profile
SL profile
France profile
French profile

1997 births
Living people
AS Saint Estève players
Catalans Dragons players
French people of Portuguese descent
French rugby league players
People from Foix
Rugby league hookers
Sportspeople from Ariège (department)
France national rugby league team players